Skardu is a city located in Gilgit−Baltistan, Pakistan. Skardu serves as the capital of Skardu District and the Baltistan Division. The city is an important gateway to the eight-thousanders of the nearby Karakoram mountain range. The Indus River running through the region separates the Karakoram from the Ladakh Range.

Etymology
The name "Skardu" is believed to be derived from the Balti word meaning "a lowland between two high places." The two referenced "high places" are Shigar city, and the high-altitude Satpara Lake

The first mention of Skardu dates to the first half of the 16th century. Mirza Haidar (1499–1551) described Askardu in the 16th-century text Tarikh-i-Rashidi Baltistan as a district of the area. The first mention of Skardu in European literature was made by Frenchman François Bernier (1625–1688), who mentions the city by the name of Eskerdou. After his mention, Skardu was quickly drawn into Asian maps produced in Europe, and was first mentioned as Eskerdow the map "Indiae orientalis nec non insularum adiacentium nova descriptio" publisbed by the Dutch engraver Nicolaes Visscher II between 1680 and 1700.

Location 

Active erosion in the nearby Karakoram Mountains has resulted in enormous deposits of sediment throughout the Skardu valley. Glaciers from the Indus and Shigar valleys broadened the Skardu valley between 3.2 million years ago up to the Holocene approximately 11,700 years ago.

History

Early history 

The Skardu region was part of the cultural sphere of Buddhist Tibet as early as the founding of the Tibetan Empire under Songtsen Gampo in the mid 7th-century CE. Tibetan tantric scriptures were found all over Baltistan until about the 9th century. Given the region's close proximity, Skardu remained in contact with tribes near Kashgar, in what is now China's westernmost province of Xinjiang.

Following the dissolution of Tibetan suzerainty over Baltistan around the 9th-10th century CE,  Baltistan came under the control of the local Maqpon Dynasty, a dynasty of Turkic extraction, which according to local tradition, is said to have been founded after a migrant from Kashmir named Ibrahim Shah married a local princess.

Maqpon period 

The Maqpon kingdom was located in Baltistan. The Maqpon dynasty, a Balti royal house based in Skardu, ruled over the region for around 700 years.  The kings of the Maqpon dynasty extended the frontiers of Baltistan to as far as Gilgit Agency, Chitral, and Ladakh.

Around the year 1500, Maqpon Bokha was crowned ruler and founded the city of Skardu as his capital. Skardu Fort was established around this time. During his reign, Makpon Bokha imported craftsmen to Skardu from Kashmir and Chilas to help develop the area's economy. While nearby Gilgit fell out of the orbit of Tibetan influence, Skardu's Baltistan region remained connected due to its close proximity to Ladakh, the region against which Skardu and neighbouring Khaplu routinely fought. Sikhs traditionally believe that Guru Nanak, the founder of Sikhism, visited Skardu during his second udasi journey between 1510 and 1515. Gurudwara Chota Nanakiana, locally known as Asthan Nanak Peer, is believed to be the place where the Guru stayed in Skardu.

History
Following the dissolution of Tibetan suzerainty over Baltistan in the 9th-10th century CE,  Baltistan came under control of the local Maqpon dynasty, which, according to local tradition, is said to have been founded after a migrant from Kashmir named Ibrahim Shah married a local princess.

In the 14th century, Muslim scholars from Kashmir crossed Baltistan's mountains to spread Islam. The Noorbakshia Sufi order further propagated the faith in Baltistan, and Islam became dominant by the end of the 17th century. With the passage of time a large number also converted to Shia Islam and a few converted to Sunni Islam.

Around the year 1500, Maqpon Bokha was crowned ruler, and founded the city of Skardu as his capital. The Skardu Fort was established around this time. During his reign, King Makpon Bokha imported craftsmen from Kashmir and Chilas to help develop the area's economy. While nearby Gilgit fell out of the orbit of Tibetan influence, Baltistan region remained connected due to its close proximity to Ladakh, the region which the dynasty routinely fought against.

In the early 1500s, Sultan Said Khan of the Timurid Yarkent Khanate in what is now Xinjiang province of China, raided Baltistan. Given the threat illustrated by the Sultan Said's invasion, Mughal attention was roused, prompting the 1586 conquest of Baltistan by the Mughal Emperor Akbar. The local Maqpon rulers pledged allegiance, and from that point onwards, beginning with Ali Sher Khan Anchan, the kings of Skardu were mentioned as rulers of Little Tibet in the historiography of the Mughal Empire.

In 1580, Ali Sher Khan Anchan became the Maqpon king. He  expanded the borders of the kingdom from Gilgit to Ladakh. When the Raja of Laddakh, Jamyang Namgyal, attacked the principalities in the district of Purik (Kargil), annihilating the Skardu garrison at Kharbu and putting to sword a number of petty Muslim rulers in the Muslim principalities in Purik (Kargil), Ali Sher Khan Anchan left with a strong army by way of Marol and, bypassing the Laddakhi army, occupied Leh, the capital of Laddakh. It appears that the Balti conquest of Laddakh took place in about 1594 A.D. The Raja of Laddakh was ultimately taken prisoner. Then Ali Sher Khan Anchan went to march on Gilgit with an army, and conquered Astore, Gilgit, Hunza, Nagar, and Chilas. From Gilgit he advanced to, and conquered, Chitral and Kafiristan.

Decline
In 1839, Dogra commander Zorawar Singh Kahluria defeated Balti forces in battles at Wanko Pass and the Thano Kun plains, clearing his path for the invasion of the Skardu valley. He seized Skardu Fort on behalf of the Dogra Kingdom based in Jammu. Singh's forces massacred a large number of the garrison's defenders, and publicly tortured Kahlon Rahim Khan of Chigtan in front of a crowd of local Baltis and their chiefs. In 1845, the region was completely subjugated by the Dogra rulers of Kashmir. and the last Maqpon King was taken as prisoner.

Rulers
Genealogy of Maqpon rulers:
1190-1220 Ibrahim
1220-1250 Astak Sange
1250-1280 Zak Sange
1280-1310 Bardak Sange
1310-1340 Sek Sange
1340-1370 Tam Gori Tham
1370-1400 Sa Gori Tham
1400-1437 Khohkor Sange
1437-1464 Ghota Cho Sange
1464-1490 Bahram Cho
1490-1515 Bo Kha
1515-1540 Sher Shah
1540-1565 Ali Khan
1565-1590 Ghazi Mir
1580-1624 Ali Sher Khan Anchan
1624-1636 Abdal Khan
1636-1655 Adam Khan
1655-1670 Murad Khan
1670-1678 Sher Khan
1678-1680 Muhammad Rafi Khan
1680-1710 Shir Khan
1710-1745 Mohammad Rafi
1745-1780 Sultan Murad
1780-1785 Azam Khan
1785-1787 Mohammad Zafar Khan
1787-1811 Ali Shir Khan
1811-1840 Ahmed Shah
(May 1840 Dogra invasion)

Gallery

Mughal period 
In the early 1500s, Sultan Said Khan of the Timurid Yarkent Khanate, of what is now Xinjiang, raided Skardu and Baltistan. Given the threat illustrated by Sultan Said's invasion, Mughal attention was aroused, prompting the 1586 conquest of Baltistan by the Mughal Emperor Akbar. The local Maqpon rulers pledged allegiance, and from that point onwards, beginning with Ali Sher Khan Anchan, the kings of Skardu were mentioned as rulers of Little Tibet in the historiography of the Mughal Empire.

Mughal forces again incurred into the region during the reign of Shah Jahan in 1634-6 under the forces of Zafar Khan, to settle a dispute over the throne between Adam Khan and his elder brother Abdul Khan. It was only after this point in the rule of Shah Jahan and Aurangzeb, that Skardu's ruling family was firmly under Mughal control. The ability of the Mughal crown to fund expeditions to territories of marginal value, such as Baltistan, emphasises the wealth of the Mughal coffers.

Dogra rule 
In 1839, Dogra commander Zorawar Singh Kahluria defeated Balti forces in battles at Wanko Pass and the Thano Kun plains, clearing his path to invade the Skardu valley. He seized Skardu Fort on behalf of the Dogra Kingdom of Jammu. Singh's forces massacred a large number of the garrison's defenders, and publicly tortured Kahlon Rahim Khan of Chigtan in front of a crowd of local Baltis and their chiefs.

Dogra forces failed in their 1841 attempt to conquer Tibet. Following their defeat, Ladakhis rebelled against Dogra rule. Baltis under the leadership of Raja Ahmed Shah soon also rebelled against the Dogras, so Maharaja Gulab Singh dispatched his commander Wazir Lakhpat to recapture Skardu. His forces were able to convince a guard to betray the garrison by leaving a gate unlocked, thereby allowing Dogra forces to recapture the fort and massacre its Balti defenders. The raja of the Baltis was forced to pay an annual tribute to the Dogra maharaja in Jammu, and also to supply the fort's provisions.

Following the Dogra victory, Muhammad Shah was crowned Raja of Skardu in return for his loyalty to the Jammu crown during the rebellion, and was able to exercise some power under the Dogra administration. Military commanders held real governing power in the area until 1851, when Kedaru Thanedar was installed as a civilian administrator of Baltistan. During this time, Skardu and Kargil were governed as a single district. Ladakh would later be joined to the district, while Skardu would serve as the district's winter capital, with Leh as the summer capital, up until 1947.

Under the administration of Mehta Mangal between 1875 and 1885, Skardu's Ranbirgarh was built as his headquarters and residence, as well as a cantonment and various other government buildings. Sikhs from Punjab were also encouraged to migrate to Skardu to set up commercial enterprises during this period. The Sikh population prospered, and continued to grow, eventually also settling in nearby Shigar and Khaplu.

1947–48 Kashmir War 
After the Partition of British India, on 22 October 1947, Pakistan launched a tribal invasion of Kashmir by Pashtuns leading to the Maharaja Hari Singh acceding to India. The Gilgit Scouts, under the leadership of Major William Brown, mutinied on 1 November 1948, bringing the Gilgit Agency under the control of Pakistan. Major Aslam Khan took over the command of the Gilgit Scouts, organised a force of some 600 men from the rebels and local recruits, and launched attacks on the remaining parts of the State under Indian control. Skardu was an important target because Aslam Khan felt that Gilgit could be threatened from there. The Skardu garrison was defended by a contingent of 6th Jammu and Kashmir Infantry under the command of Col. Sher Jung Thapa. The initial attack of the rebels was repulsed, but the city fell into the rebel hands, cutting off supplies to the garrison. After holding the  garrison for 6 months and 3 days, Thapa and his forces surrendered on 14 August 1948.

Administration 
The city of Skardu constitutes a tehsil within Skardu District. Skardu District itself is the part of the larger Baltistan Division. The Skardu city being a tehsil/taluka is administrated by an Assistant Commissioner of BPS-17 belonging to Pakistan Administrative service whereas Skardu District administrated by a Deputy Commissioner BPS-19 of Pakistan Administrative Service. The Current DC Skardu is Karimdad Chugtai.

Geography

Topography
Upstream from Skardu are some of the largest glaciers in the world, including the Baltoro Glacier, Biafo Glacier, and Chogo Lungma Glacier. The Deosai National Park, the world's second highest alpine plain, is located upstream of Skardu as well.

Geology

Skardu is located along the Kohistan-Ladakh terrane, formed as a magmatic arch over a Tethyan subduction zone that was later accreted onto the Eurasian Plate. The region has low seismic activity compared to surrounding regions, suggesting that Skardu is located in a passive structural element of the Himalayan thrust. The stone in the Skardu region is Katzara schist, with a radiometric age of 37 to 105 million years.

Numerous complex granitic pegmatites and a few alpine-cleft metamorphic deposits are found in the Shigar Valley and its tributaries. Shigar Valley contains the Main Karokoram Thrust separating the metasediments (chlorite to amphibolite grade) on the Asian plate from the southern volcanoclastic rocks of the Kohistan-Ladakh island arc.

Climate

 
Skardu features a cold semi-arid climate (Köppen climate classification BSk). The climate of Skardu during the summer is moderated by its mountain setting; the intense heat of lowland Pakistan does not reach it. The mountains block out the summer monsoon, and summer rainfall is thus quite low. However, these mountains result in very severe winter weather.

Temperatures can drop to below  in the December-to-January midwinter period.

Tourism

Skardu, along with Gilgit, is a major tourism, trekking and expedition hub in Gilgit–Baltistan. The mountainous terrain of the region, which includes four of the world's 14 Eight-thousander peaks, attracts tourists, trekkers and mountaineers from around the world. The main tourist season is from April to October; at other times of the year, the area can be cut off for extended periods by the snowy, freezing winter weather.

Mountains

Accessible from Skardu by road, the nearby Askole and Hushe are the main gateways to the snow-covered  peaks including K2, the Gasherbrums, Broad Peak, and the Trango Towers, and to the huge glaciers of Baltoro, Biafo and Trango. This makes Skardu the main tourist and mountaineering base in the area, which has led to the development of a reasonably extensive tourist infrastructure including shops and hotels. The popularity of the region results in high prices, especially during the main trekking season.

Deosai National Park

In the local Balti language, Deosai is called Byarsa བྱིར་ས, meaning 'summer place'.

Skardu Fort

The fort dates from the 8th century CE and contains an old mosque probably dating back to the arrival of Islam in the 16th century CE. The fort provides a panoramic view of Skardu town, the Skardu valley and the Indus River. It was built by Maqpon dynasty rulers of Baltistan. It was a seven-storey building. Mostly local people say that Kharpoocho is made by a ghost as they were servants of the ruler of that time.

Kharphocho (Skardu) fort was built on a design similar to that of Leh Palace and the Potala Palace in Lhasa, Tibet. The name Kharpochhe means the great fort — Khar in Tibetan means castle or fort and Chhe means great.

Shigar Fort

Located on the route to the world's second highest mountain, K-2 is Shigar Fort. It is also known as Fong-Khar, which in the local language means the "Palace on the Rock". The complex at Shigar comprises the 400-year-old fort/palace and two more recent buildings: the "Old House" and the "Garden House". The former palace of the Raja of Shigar has been transformed into a 20-room heritage guesthouse, with the grand audience hall serving as a museum of Balti culture and featuring select examples of fine wood-carvings, as well as other heritage objects.

Kachura Lakes

There are two Kachura lakes in Kachura Valley — the less well-known (Upper) Kachura Lake and the more famous Shangrila Lake ("Lower Kachura Lake"). Shangrila Lake is home to the Shangrila Resort hotel complex (possibly the reason for the lake's alternative name), built in a Chinese style and another popular destination for tourists in Pakistan-administered Kashmir. The resort has a unique restaurant, set up inside the fuselage of an aircraft that crashed On 3 October 1953, a DC-3 Aircraft belonging to Orient Airways crashed landed after three minutes of taking off. Although all people on the aircraft survived the crash, the plane never saw another day in the sky.
Kachura Lake is famous for its deep blue waters. The lakes, at 2,500 meters in elevation.

Satpara Lake

Satpara Lake is Skardu Valley's main lake. In 2002, the Federal Government decided to build a dam on the Satpara Lake allocating $10 million to the project, in 2004. Progress has, however, been slow. Satpara Lake is one of the largest fresh water lakes in the countryside offering trout fishing and row boating. This lake is the source of Skardu's drinking water. The dam was mostly completed in 2011 and four powerhouse units are operational; the latest started operation in June 2013.

Transport

Road
The normal road route into Skardu is via the Karakorum Highway and a Skardu Road (S1) into the Skardu Valley from it. Roads once linked Skardu to Srinagar and Leh, though none are open for cross-LoC travel.

Skardu's weather can have adverse effects on transport in and out of the region, as Skardu is often snowbound during the winter months. Roads in and out of Skardu can be blocked for extended periods of time, sometimes leaving air travel as the only feasible alternative.

Air
On 2 December 2021, the Skardu International Airport was designated and re-inaugurated as an international airport after providing upgrades to the airport to become a tourism hub for Gilgit-Baltistan.

Flydubai has submitted a request to start international operations to and from Skardu airport, which would potentially become the first airline to start international routes from Skardu.

Infrastructure

Satpara Dam
The Satpara Dam development project on the Satpara Lake was inaugurated in 2003. It was completed in 2011. The main source of water is icemelt from the Deosai plains during the summer season. Now Satpara Dam provides drinking water to the whole city of Skardu and agricultural water to major areas of Skardu, for example, Gayoul, Newrangha, Khlangranga, Shigari Khurd, etc.

It is a multipurpose project, which will produce 17.36 megawatts hydro generation, irrigate  of land and provide 13 cusecs drinking water daily to Skardu city.

Notable people
Amen Aamir, first woman from Gilgit-Baltistan to qualify as a pilot

See also
Baltistan
Ladakh
Northern Areas
Satpara Dam
Haji Gham

References

Bibliography

Further reading
 Jettmar, Karl et al. (1985): Zwischen Gandhara und den Seidenstrassen: Felsbilder am Karakorum Highway: Entdeckungen deutsch-pakistanischer Expeditionen 1979–1984. 1985. Mainz am Rhein, Philipp von Zabern.
 Jettmar. Karl (1980): Bolor & Dardistan. Karl Jettmar. Islamabad, National Institute of Folk Heritage.

External links 

 Skardu - Emerging Pakistan
 

Populated places in Skardu District
Skardu District
Baltistan
Populated places established in the 2nd millennium
History of Gilgit-Baltistan
History of Baltistan
Balti people